Jaimini Sutras, also known as Upadesa Sutras is an ancient Sanskrit text on the predictive part of Hindu astrology, attributed to the sage Jaimini, the founder of the Purva Mimamsa branch of Hindu philosophy, a disciple of Vyasa and grandson of Parashara. It comprises nine hundred and thirty-six sutras or aphorisms arranged in four chapters, and though having several distinct features of its own, the Jaimini System, which is a unique system, appears as an offshoot of the Parashari System only; wherever it deviates, it is not found to be in conflict with the Parashari system, and gives due importance to Rahu and Ketu, the two Lunar Nodes.

Jaimini Sutras, arranged in four chapters, cover Karakamsa, Arudha, Upapada and navamsa in the first chapter; Longevity, Diseases, Profession, Progeny and Spouse, in the second; Longevity, Nature and cause of death, in the third; and in the fourth chapter it covers the account of pre-natal epoch. The Jaimini System of prognostication is distinctly different from the Parashari System, the basic differences being with regard to Rasi aspects, determination of Karakas, Badhaka bhavas and the Dashas. In Jaimini System, aspect has been assigned to the Rasis or signs which are synonymous with Bhavas or Houses, the Karakas are fixed according to longitudes gained by planets in particular signs, the Dashas are assigned to signs, and the method of determination of Badhakas is far more complicated, and its prediction-method based on Padas is also different. In his book, Light on Life, Hart De Fouf writes – It is possible that some commentator developed Jaimini Jyotish from Parashara’s system and then appended Maharshi Jaimini’s name to his creation….or may be .. ..extracted those few chapters from Jaimini Jyotish that the two systems share.

Bangalore Venkata Raman’s book - Studies in Jaimini Astrology – explains the abstruseness of the Jaimini System particularly when a number of dashas are mentioned and the reader, clueless, is left to guess for himself. Jaimini developed almost a new system which did not prove popular because principles presented in the shape of sutras are always capable of a variety of interpretations; Jaimini Sutras have been explained and commented upon by Neelakantha and Premanidhi. Jaimini appears to have favoured Charadasha not only for determining longevity but also for predicting important events to happen during the life of a person. Raman has found certain sutras tough, vague or capable of a two-fold interpretation. He also states that the Raja yogas given by Jaimini have not been tested as his method has not been in vogue.

Jaimini, in the Sutra 37 of Adhyaya II Pada iv, by stating सिद्धमन्यत् acknowledges that all the principles explained in this work are truth propounded in other works. The treatment of the different Bhavas, Rasis and Planets found confusing require patience, diligence and practice to comprehend. He gives various Lagnas and his dashas are mostly founded on Rasis and Navamsas, and also the calculations backwards and forwards for odd and even signs and the extent of dashas differs from the ordinary conceptions as explained by the general principles of astrology. He has not given prominence to the Nakshatras and there is the merging of two or three planets into one karaka. Moreover, the exact meanings of the sutras which though short and sweet, and easily committed to memory, are not easy to grasp.

References

Sanskrit texts
Hindu astrological texts